Engaeus australis, the lilly pilly burrowing crayfish, is a species of crayfish in the family Parastacidae. It is endemic to Australia. Engaeus australis is in the Near-threatened status in the International Union for Conservation of Nature(IUCN)'s List.

References

Sources
Doran, N. & Horwitz, P. 2010. Engaeus australis. IUCN Red List of Threatened Species 2010. Retrieved 5 February 2017.

Parastacidae
Freshwater crustaceans of Australia
Crustaceans described in 1969
Taxonomy articles created by Polbot